Boris Carène (born 7 December 1985 in Pointe-à-Pitre) is a French professional road bicycle racer, from Guadeloupe, who currently rides for French amateur team VC Lucéen. In 2011, he was the winner of the 61st edition of the Tour de Guadeloupe. He won the 2012 Caribbean Cycling Championships in Antigua.

Major results

2005
 6th Overall Tour de Guadeloupe
2007
 4th Overall Tour de Guadeloupe
1st Young rider classification
2009
 4th Overall Tour de Guadeloupe
1st Stage 6
2010
 2nd Overall Tour de Guadeloupe
2011
 1st  Overall Tour de Guadeloupe
 3rd Overall Tour de Martinique
1st Stage 10 (ITT)
2013
 9th Overall Tour de Guadeloupe
2014
 6th Overall Tour de Guadeloupe
 6th Duo Normand (with Johan Coenen)
 7th Tour du Jura
2015
 1st  Overall Tour de Guadeloupe
1st Stage 2b (ITT), 4 & 8b (ITT)
 6th Overall Vuelta a la Independencia Nacional
2017
 6th Overall Tour de Guadeloupe
 9th Overall Vuelta a la Independencia Nacional
 10th Time trial, Pan American Road Championships
2018
 1st  Overall Tour de Guadeloupe
1st Stage 2b (ITT)

References

External links 

French male cyclists
French people of Guadeloupean descent
Guadeloupean male cyclists
Tour de Guadeloupe winners
Tour de Guadeloupe stage winners
1985 births
Living people